Arrowtooth eel may refer to several species of cutthroat eels:

 Shortbelly eel, Dysomma anguillare
 Deepwater arrowtooth eel, Histiobranchus bathybius
 Kaup's arrowtooth eel, Synaphobranchus kaupii
 Muddy arrowtooth eel, Ilyophis brunneus
 Pignosed arrowtooth eel, Dysomma brevirostre